Philippe Gagné (born October 23, 1997) is a Canadian elite diver. He won a silver medal at the 10 m platform and a bronze medal at the 3 m springboard at the 2014 Summer Youth Olympics. He competed at several World Cups and Grand Prix events.

Gagne was born in Montreal, Quebec.

He was selected as a member of the Canadian Olympic team for the 2016 games in Rio. He progressed through the preliminary and semi-final rounds, finishing 11th in the final with a score of 425.30 in the 3m springboard event.

Achievements 
 2014 – 2014 Summer Youth Olympics – Silver on 10M and Bronze on 3M.
 2013 – Pan American Junior Championship – Silver on 1M & 3M synchro (with V. Riendeau), Bronze on 10M, 4th on 3M
 2013 – Canada Summer Games – Gold on 3M & 10M, Bronze on 3M synchro (Leathead)
 2013 – Speedo Junior Elite National Championships – Gold on 1M, 3M & 3M synchro (Leathead), Silver on 10M
 2013 – Summer Senior National Championships – Gold on 10M & 10M synchro (Bouchard)
 2013 – Puerto Rico Grand Prix – Bronze on 10M & Silver on 10M synchro (with Bouchard)
 2013 – Gillette Canada Cup – 11th on 10M & 6th on 10M synchro (Bouchard)
 2013 – Winter Senior National Championships – Silver on 10M & Gold on 10M synchro (Bouchard)
 2012 – Speedo Junior National Championships – Gold on 1M, 3M & 10M
 2011 – Speedo Junior National Championships – Bronze on 1M
 2011 – Summer Senior National Championships – Silver on 10M synchro (Papineau)
 2010 – Speedo Junior National Championships – Gold on 1M, 3M & 10M
 2009 – Speedo Junior National Championships – Gold on 10M, Silver on 1M
 2008 – Speedo Junior National Championships – Gold on 1M & 10M, Silver on 3M

References

External links
Diving Plongeon Canada

1997 births
Canadian male divers
Living people
Divers at the 2014 Summer Youth Olympics
Pan American Games silver medalists for Canada
Pan American Games bronze medalists for Canada
Divers from Montreal
Divers at the 2015 Pan American Games
Divers at the 2016 Summer Olympics
Divers at the 2018 Commonwealth Games
Olympic divers of Canada
Pan American Games medalists in diving
Commonwealth Games silver medallists for Canada
Commonwealth Games medallists in diving
Divers at the 2019 Pan American Games
Medalists at the 2015 Pan American Games
Medalists at the 2019 Pan American Games
Youth Olympic silver medalists for Canada
Youth Olympic bronze medalists for Canada
21st-century Canadian people
Medallists at the 2018 Commonwealth Games